This is a discography for the Scottish new wave band Aztec Camera.

Aztec Camera had success during the 1980s and 1990s with six hit studio albums. They are most recognised internationally for their hit single "Somewhere in My Heart".

Albums

Studio albums

Compilation albums

Box sets

EPs

Singles

Cover versions
Van Halen: "Jump" (released in 1985) 
Blue Orchids: "Bad Education" (released in 1987)
"The Red Flag" (traditional song released in 1988)  
Edwyn Collins: "Consolation Prize" (released in 1990) 
Cyndi Lauper: "True Colors" (released in 1990) 
Cole Porter: "Do I Love You?" (released in 1990)
Amen Corner: "(If Paradise Is) Half As Nice" (released in 1992)

References

External links
Official website
Roddy Frame on AED
"Killermont Street" – a fan site for Roddy Frame and Aztec Camera

Discographies of British artists
Rock music group discographies
New wave discographies